Charles Anthony Bennett (born February 9, 1963) is a former American football defensive end in the National Football League (NFL) who played for the Miami Dolphins. He played college football at University of Louisiana at Lafayette.

References 

1963 births
Living people
People from Bolivar County, Mississippi
Players of American football from Mississippi
American football defensive ends
Louisiana Ragin' Cajuns football players
Miami Dolphins players